The Herengracht index is a study of house prices along the Herengracht canal in Amsterdam. The index was created by real estate finance professor Piet Eichholz of Maastricht University. The Herengracht house price index goes all the way back to the construction of the Herengracht in the 1620s. It was first published from 1628 up to 1973, and later extended to 2008.

References 

Price indices